Sphingomonas ginsengisoli  is a bacterium from the genus of Sphingomonas which has been isolated from soil from a ginseng field in Pocheon in Korea.

References

Further reading

External links
Type strain of Sphingomonas ginsengisoli at BacDive -  the Bacterial Diversity Metadatabase	

ginsengisoli
Bacteria described in 2013